The Last Message (Chinese: 天才與白痴) is a 1975 Hong Kong comedy film directed by and starring Michael Hui, and co-starring Samuel Hui, with a cameo appearance by Ricky Hui. This is the second film of the Hui Brothers.

Plot
Tim (Michael Hui) and Lee (Samuel Hui) are employees of a mental hospital working as an orderly and nurse respectively. One day a crazy man named Cheng Ming (Roy Chiao) is institutionalized who carries a bag of trash. Tim and Lee discover that the bag is full of artifacts from the Ming Dynasty. Unfortunately, they are all broken pieces and cannot be traded for money. Then, Cheng talks about a Princess and Tim and Lee figure that Cheng knows where are the artifacts from. Later on, Cheng dies from heart attack and Tim and Lee find Princess (Eileen Humphreys) and find out that she is Cheng's daughter. Princess tells them that her father discovered a sunk boat at the coast of Hong Kong. Tim and Lee starts to plan for their luxurious life, including quitting their jobs, and set out to find the artifacts. They do discover tons of it and brings it to trade for money. However, the ones Tim and Lee find are revealed to be fakes. With their fancy  of luxury over, Lee gets his job back and Tim got insane and became a mental patient.

Cast
 Michael Hui as Tim
 Samuel Hui as Nurse Lee
 Ricky Hui as waiter on skate
 James Tien as traffic cop
 Roy Chiao as Cheng Ming
 Ray Cordeiro as Policeman
 Dean Shek as hotel clerk
 Eileen Humphreys as Princess
 Lau Yat-fan as Police Chief
 Chiang Nan as antique dealer
 Siu Kam as Arab bodyguard
 Wong Sam as Dr. Wong
 Fung Ngai as Mr. Chow
 Joseph Koo as doctor in operation
 Tsang Cho-lam as schizo, Chan Keung
 Hao Li-jen as mental patient, dies in bed
 Ho Pak-kwong as hospital attendant with crabs and frogs
 Ching Siu-tung sd student scuba diver
 Fung King-man as mental patient, Barbitone
 Kam Lau as Tim's mother
 Chu Yau-ko as mental patient, eating disorder
 Sai Gwa-Pau as mental patient, likes death
 Hong Ka-yan as Nurse
 To Sam-ku as Ms. Chow
 The Lotus as band
 Luk Chin as Catholic priest at hospital

Partial soundtrack
Tin choi yu bak chi (天才與白痴) is an album by Samuel Hui, released in 1975 by Polydor Records in Hong Kong. The first four tracks of the album are heard in the film.

Lyrics
     人皆尋夢　夢裡不分西東
     片刻春風得意　未知景物矇矓

     人生如夢　夢裡輾轉吉凶
     尋樂不堪苦困　未識苦與樂同

   ＊天造之才　皆有其用
     振翅高飛　無須在夢中

   ＃南柯長夢　夢裡不知所中
     醉翁他朝醒覺　是否跨鳳成龍

     重唱　＊,＃,＊

     何必尋夢　夢裡甘苦皆空
     勸君珍惜此際　自當欣慰無窮
     何必尋夢

Notes

External links
 
 The Last Message at Hong Kong Cinemagic
 

1975 films
1975 comedy films
Hong Kong slapstick comedy films
1970s Cantonese-language films
Golden Harvest films
Films directed by Michael Hui
Films set in Hong Kong
Films shot in Hong Kong
1970s Hong Kong films